Caladenia nothofageti, commonly known as beech caladenia or white fingers, is a plant in the orchid family Orchidaceae and is endemic to New Zealand. It has a single, sparsely hairy, long, thin leaf and one or two white flowers with greenish-white backs, on a thin stalk.

Description
Caladenia nothofageti is a terrestrial, perennial, deciduous, herb with an underground tuber. The dorsal sepal is erect, to slightly curved forward, the lateral sepals and petals are held horizontally or slightly downwards. The sides of the labellum turn upwards and  partly embrace the column and there are four to six blunt teeth on the edges near the front, with the tip of the labellum curled under. There are two rows of pale yellow calli along the centre of the labellum. Flowering occurs from November to January but the flowers are self-pollinating and only open for a day or two.<ref name="nzpcn">{{cite web|title=Caladenia nothofageti|url=http://m.nzpcn.org.nz/flora_details.aspx?ID=1108|publisher=New Zealand Plant Conservation Network|accessdate=24 February 2017}}</ref>

Taxonomy and namingCaladenia nothofageti was first formally described in 1997 by David Jones, Brian Molloy and Mark Clements and the description was published in The Orchadian.

Distribution and habitat
Beech caladenia occurs on both the North and South Island of New Zealand growing in Nothofagus forest in well-lit sites.

ConservationCaladenia nothofageti'' is listed as "not threatened" in New Zealand.

References

nothofageti
Plants described in 1853
Orchids of New Zealand
Taxa named by David L. Jones (botanist)